Isaac D. Smith (born 2 May 1932) was a major general in the United States Army.

Education
Smith was in the Reserve Officers Training Corps at Southern University and A&M College, where he earned a B.S. in Agriculture.  He also earned a Masters in Public Administration from Shippensburg State College. He also completed several military education courses and attended the U.S. Army War College.

Assignments
According to The Rocks, inc., website:

In 1983, when Smith was a Brigadier general, The Crisis named him one of the "top blacks in the Armed Forces."  At the time, he held the same rank as Colin Powell.  He was noted in Blacks in American armed forces: 1776-1983, as well as African American generals and flag officers.

Smith was the author of a major Army report on THE DEPENDENTS SCHOOLS SYSTEM IN USAREUR, about the education of "army brats" in Europe.

In 1989, the Comptroller General of the Department of Defense found that Smith failed to abide by the "Fly America Act", which required use of US-based airlines for military flights; Smith's case became a precedent.

Awards
Smith won several DOD awards and decorations including the Distinguished Service Medal, the Silver Star, Defense Superior Service Medal, the Legion of Merit (with Oak Leaf Cluster), Bronze Star Medal, the Meritorious Service Medal (with Oak Leaf Cluster), and the Army Commendation Medal (with two Oak Leaf Clusters).

In 1999, Smith was named "Rock of the Year" by The Rocks, Inc., an association of ROTC officers.

In 2006, Smith, by then a retired major general, received a citation from the Louisiana House of Representatives for his service to the United States, which was also passed by the Louisiana Senate.

References

African-American United States Army personnel
Living people
Recipients of the Legion of Merit
United States Army generals
Recipients of the Silver Star
Shippensburg University of Pennsylvania alumni
Recipients of the Defense Superior Service Medal
1932 births
21st-century African-American people
20th-century African-American people